Maxime Mignon (born 17 August 1990) is a Belgian professional footballer who plays as a goalkeeper for URSL Visé.

Club career
On 30 June 2022, Mignon joined URSL Visé in the third-tier Belgian National Division 1 on a one-year contract with an option for a second year.

References 

1990 births
Living people
Belgian footballers
Association football goalkeepers
R.F.C. Seraing (1922) players
URSL Visé players
Belgian Third Division players
Challenger Pro League players
Belgian National Division 1 players